The Southern Alliance for Clean Energy (SACE) is a nonprofit advocacy group that promotes the use of clean energy in the southeastern United States.

History 
SACE was founded in 1985 under the original name Tennessee Valley Energy Coalition (TVEC). TVEC championed for rate-payer protections and tracked the environmental and energy policies of the Tennessee Valley Authority.

In 1992, TVEC's name changed to Tennessee Valley Energy Reform Coalition (TVERC). In 1993, Stephen A. Smith, SACE's current executive director, became the executive director of TVERC after serving on the board.

Following completion of TVA's 1995 IRP, TVERC shifted its focus to research on air pollution and efforts to clean up or retire coal-fired power plants. In 1997, TVERC worked with the Tennessee Clean Air Task Force. In 1998, TVERC engaged with TVA to launch the Green Power Switch program, giving TVA rate-payers the option to support wind, solar, and biogas renewable resources.

In 1999, TVERC was renamed the Southern Alliance For Clean Energy (SACE) as the organization expanded its focus beyond the TVA service area to encompass clean energy efforts with other utility providers in Florida and South Carolina. In 2001, SACE merged with Georgians For Clean Energy, thereby expanding its influence in the Southeast to also include Georgia.

Since 2001, SACE's programs have expanded to address multiple issues relating to energy and the environment, such as increasing solar power programs and the use of clean, electric transportation, reducing reliance on fossil fuel power stations, and addressing climate change.

References

External links 

 Official website

Renewable energy organizations based in the United States
1985 establishments in Tennessee
Environmental organizations based in Tennessee